Watumba! is an album by Austrian band Erste Allgemeine Verunsicherung. It was published in 1991.

Track listing
"Neandertal"
"Jambo"
"Wer riecht so streng ..."
"Die Ufos kommen"
"Würger"
"Neppo-Nepp"
"Hildegard"
"Hip-Hop"
"Inspektor Tatü"
"Erzherzog Jogerl"
"Dudelsack-Dudu"
"Alk-Parade"

Lyrics: Thomas Spitzer

Personnel
Klaus Eberhartinger (lead vocals)
Thomas Spitzer (guitar)
Eik Breit (bass)
Nino Holm (keyboards)
Andy Töfferl (keyboards, vocals)
Günther Schönberger (saxophone)
Anders Stenmo (percussion)

Erste Allgemeine Verunsicherung albums
1991 albums
German-language albums